Gasolin' (also called Gas 1) is the debut studio album by Danish rock band Gasolin'. It was released in November 1971 by CBS Records. Instead of boogie rock and catchy tunes, they relied on creating songs with a moody feel such as "Langebro", "Fra dag til dag" and "Tremastet beton". The latter is recited by the poet Mogens Mogensen. Lead singer Kim Larsen later jokingly referred to the song as the first Danish rap. The lyrics and the music have a dark and mysterious ambience. From this album "Langebro" was released on the single with "Lilli-Lilli" on the b-side.

The album was produced by the band itself in Copenhagen and sound engineer, Freddy Hansson went to Trident Studios in London to mix it with Roy Thomas Baker. He would later become Gasolin's producer. The cover was an illustration made by Hergé (originally from The Seven Crystal Balls), who loved the fact that a rock band would use one of his drawings for an album cover.

The album was released on CD in 1987 with Gasolin' 2 (1972) but due to lack of space "Tremastet beton" was omitted. It was remastered for CD in 1991 and in 2003 it was included in The Black Box box set.

Track listing

Personnel

Gasolin'
Wili Jønsson – bass guitar, piano, vocals
Kim Larsen – vocals, guitar accompaniment
Franz Beckerlee – lead guitar, alto saxophone, harmonica, vocals
Søren Berlev – drums, vocals, acoustic guitar on "Jeg kan høre dig kalde"

Additional musicians
Mogens Mogensen – vocals on "Tremastet beton"

Production
Gasolin' – producer
Sture Lindén – executive producer
Poul Bruun – executive producer
Freddy Hansson – engineer
Roy Thomas Baker – mixing in Trident Studios, London

References

External links

Gasolin' albums
1971 debut albums
Danish-language albums
Albums produced by Kim Larsen
Albums produced by Wili Jønsson